Events during the year 1995 in Northern Ireland.

Incumbents
 Secretary of State - Patrick Mayhew

Events 
27 January - Taoiseach John Bruton, and Gerry Adams hold their first formal discussions.
22 February - The British Prime Minister, John Major, and the Irish Taoiseach, John Bruton, launch the framework document regarding Northern Ireland.
7 March - Sir Patrick Mayhew, Northern Ireland Secretary, sets out the conditions for Sinn Féin to join all-party talks, including 'the actual decommissioning of some arms.'
19 May - Elizabeth II and The Duke of Edinburgh make a visit to Northern Ireland. On the same day US President Bill Clinton approves a visa for Gerry Adams to enter the United States.
4 June - Ireland qualifies for the quarter-finals of the Rugby World Cup.
13 August - Gerry Adams tells a rally in Belfast that the IRA 'haven't gone away.'
9 September - David Trimble becomes leader of the Ulster Unionist Party.
30 November - American President Bill Clinton and his wife Hillary spend the day in Northern Ireland.

Arts and literature
5 October - Seamus Heaney is awarded the Nobel Prize for Literature.
BBC Northern Ireland television broadcasts The Hole in the Wall Gang's comedy Two Ceasefires and a Wedding, the pilot for Give My Head Peace.
Ormeau Baths Gallery opened in Belfast, on the site of a Victorian bath house.
Phil Coulter writes the anthem "Ireland's Call" to a commission from the Irish Rugby Football Union.
Michael Longley's translation of classical verse into Ulster Scots, The Ghost Orchid, is published.

Sport

Boxing
Wayne McCullough wins WBC Bantamweight title.

Football
Irish League
Winners: Crusaders

Irish Cup
Winners: Linfield 3 - 1 Carrick Rangers

FAI Cup
Winners: Derry City 2 - 1 Shelbourne

Harry Gregg, former international footballer, awarded an MBE.

Gaelic Athletic Association
September 17 - Dublin are the All-Ireland football Champions following victory over Tyrone. Peter Canavan is unlucky to be on the losing side following his personal haul of 11 points in the final.

Births
21 January - Andrew Watson, racing driver

Deaths
29 March - Jimmy McShane (aka Baltimora), dancer and singer (born 1957).
6 May - Noel Brotherston, footballer (born 1956).
7 June - Joseph Tomelty, actor, novelist and playwright (born 1911).
27 June - Gordon Wilson, peace campaigner (born 1927).
21 September - Frank Hall, journalist and satirist (born 1921).

See also
1995 in England
1995 in Scotland
1995 in Wales

References

 
Northern Ireland